Amy Elisabeth Rollinson (born 18 June 2004) is a British diver in the springboard (1 and 3 metre) events.

Career 
Amy Rollinson made her national team debut at the 2021 FINA Grand Prix at the age of 16. In June 2022, Rollinson was named to England's 2022 Commonwealth Games team. She won a bronze medal in the one metre springboard event and came 4th in the women's synchronised three metre springboard alongside Desharne Bent-Ashmeil.

References 

2004 births
Living people
English female divers
Divers at the 2022 Commonwealth Games
Commonwealth Games medallists in diving
Commonwealth Games bronze medallists for England
Sportspeople from Luton
21st-century British women
Medallists at the 2022 Commonwealth Games